The 2018 Hungarian Challenger Open was a professional tennis tournament played on indoor hard courts. It was the third edition of the tournament and was a part of the 2018 ATP Challenger Tour. It took place in Budapest, Hungary between 5 and 11 February 2018.

Singles main-draw entrants

Seeds

 1 Rankings are as of January 29, 2018.

Other entrants
The following players received wildcards into the singles main draw:
  Gábor Borsos
  Péter Nagy
  Zsombor Piros
  Máté Valkusz

The following player received entry into the singles main draw as an alternate:
  Nicola Kuhn

The following players received entry from the qualifying draw:
  Jeremy Jahn
  Kevin Krawietz
  Constant Lestienne
  Andrea Pellegrino

Champions

Singles

 Vasek Pospisil def.  Nicola Kuhn 7–6(7–3), 3–6, 6–3.

Doubles

 Félix Auger-Aliassime /  Nicola Kuhn def.  Marin Draganja /  Tomislav Draganja 2–6, 6–2, [11–9].

External links
 Official website

2018 ATP Challenger Tour
2018 in Hungarian tennis